Julia Kiniski (1899 in Poland – October 11, 1969 in Edmonton, Alberta), was a four-term aldermen on the Edmonton City Council from 1963 until her death in 1969. Kiniski had previously been an unsuccessful candidate in 14 of the city's annual elections, between 1945 and 1962, running as an independent or as a candidate for far-left parties.

Kiniski's family emigrated to Chipman, Alberta in 1912. At the age of sixteen she married her husband, Nicholas, with whom she raised six children, including wrestler Gene Kiniski. In 1936, Kiniski and her husband moved to Edmonton. He worked as a barber, making $5 ($ today) a week, while she sold cosmetics and managed a café. Having dropped out of school after Grade 7, in later life Kiniski "[e]nrolled in University of Alberta Extension courses, studying psychology, philosophy and world affairs".

During her numerous unsuccessful campaigns for local office, Kiniski "became an accomplished, albeit unconventional, speaker". As a politician, she was "[k]nown and loved as supporter of the common people", whose success spurred renewed civic involvement:

As a member of the city council, "[o]ne of her pet projects... was her fight to support tenants in basement suites".

She died of a heart attack at the age of 70, and was succeeded in office by her son, Julian Kinisky, who won his mother's vacated seat in a 1970 by-election.

An elementary school in Edmonton is named for her, as is the neighbourhood of Kiniski Gardens.

Table of election results

Elections won are in bold. From 1899 to 1963, Edmonton held annual municipal elections, replacing half of the alderman each year.  Kiniski stood for election in 14 of 18 elections from 1945 to 1962, winning in her 15th attempt in 1963. Beginning in 1964, all seats were up for election every two years.

References

1899 births
1969 deaths
Women municipal councillors in Canada
Edmonton city councillors
Women in Alberta politics
20th-century Canadian women politicians
Emigrants from the Russian Empire to Canada